Sie or SIE may refer to:

People 
 Donald-Olivier Sié (born 1970), footballer
 James Sie (born 1962), voice actor
 John J. Sie,  businessman 
 Trish Sie, choreographer and director

Other uses 
 SIE (file format), for accounting data
 Army Intelligence Service, Argentina
 Foreign Intelligence Service (Romania)
 Sherburn-in-Elmet railway station, in England
 Sie Kensou, a character in The King of Fighters
 Sie language, spoken in Vanuatu
 Simaa language, spoken in Zambia
 Society of Industrial Engineering, a student society
 Sony Interactive Entertainment, multinational video game and digital entertainment company
 Special Intervention Squadron (Dutch ), now the Belgian Federal Police Special Units
 Specific ion electrode
 Staten Island Expressway, in Staten Island, New York City, US
 "Sie", proposed gender-neutral pronoun